Metalbilly is the fusion of hard rock music with rockabilly.

References

Fusion music genres
Rockabilly genres
Heavy metal genres